5 Weddings is a 2018 American film set in the United States and India. Directed by Namrata Singh Gujral, the film features Nargis Fakhri, Rajkummar Rao, Bo Derek, Candy Clark, Anneliese Van der Pol and Suvinder Vicy.

Plot 
An American journalist travels to India for a magazine feature on multiple Indian wedding ceremonies. The film also deals with the community of transgender people called hijra who dance at these weddings.

Cast
 Rajkummar Rao as police officer Harbhajan Singh
 Nargis Fakhri as Shania Dhaliwal
 Bo Derek as Mandy Singh Dhaliwal
 Candy Clark as Claudia Burrell
 Anneliese van der Pol as Whitney Simmons
 Shiwani Saini as Devika
 Suvinder Vicky as Police Commissioner Mr. Gill
 Saru Maini as Bhavna
 Mariana Vicente as Alexa DuPont
 Dawn Richard as Lydia Duniyer
 Diljott as Harleen
 Robert Palmer Watkins as Mark Cottell

Background
The film was initially set to be filmed in 2008 with Namrata Singh Gujral and Harbhajan Mann in the lead. Due to her ten-year journey with cancer, Gujral ended up directing the film with Nargis Fakhri playing the lead role of Shania Dhaliwal and Rajkummar Rao playing the role of Harbhajan Singh. Rajkummar Rao's character was initially called Rahul but was changed to Harbhajan's name when Harbhajan Mann was being considered to play the lead.

Soundtrack

Release
The film is banned in Kuwait and Qatar because of the hijra / transgender angle and has undergone extensive censorship in India, Malaysia and several other countries.

Locations
The film has been shot in Los Angeles, Hollywood, Burbank and in Chandigarh, Mohali and Mani Majra.

References

External links
 

2018 films
Indian crossover films
Indian drama films
2010s English-language films
Films set in Los Angeles
Films set in India
Transgender-related films
Films about Indian weddings
2010s Hindi-language films
Films set in Punjab, India
Films shot in California
Films shot in Los Angeles
Films shot in Chandigarh
Films shot in Punjab, India
Indian LGBT-related films
2018 LGBT-related films
LGBT-related drama films
Hijra (South Asia)
2018 drama films
Hindi-language drama films